Serhiy Mykolayovych Velychko (born 9 August 1976 in Simferopol, Crimea, Ukrainian SSR) is a Ukrainian football goalkeeper who played for Vorskla Poltava in the Ukrainian Premier League.

External links 

 Official Website Profile

1976 births
Living people
Sportspeople from Simferopol
Ukrainian footballers
Ukrainian footballers banned from domestic competitions
FC Naftovyk-Ukrnafta Okhtyrka players
SC Tavriya Simferopol players
FC Hoverla Uzhhorod players
FC Vorskla Poltava players
FC Hvardiyets Hvardiiske players
FC Bakhchisaray players
Ukrainian Premier League players
Ukrainian Amateur Football Championship players
Ukrainian First League players
Ukrainian Second League players
Crimean Premier League players
Association football goalkeepers
FC Yevpatoriya managers
Ukrainian football managers